The Multishow Brazilian Music Award (in Portuguese: Prêmio Multishow de Música Brasileira) is an award presented by the Brazilian cable channel Multishow to honor the best in the Brazilian music medium. The first ceremony was held in 1994 in Rio de Janeiro, Brazil. The biggest winner of the award is the singer Ivete Sangalo.

2017 Multishow Brazilian Music Award
Anitta was nominated for the 2017 Multishow Brazilian Music Award, she received 9 nominations, won in 3 categories. Her performance in the awards was the most viewed on the web, because her chest ended up appearing during the presentation.

Winners and indicated

References

Recurring events established in 1994
Annual television shows
Awards established in 1994
South American music awards
Television in Brazil
1994 establishments in Brazil